Wild Birds is a 1955 Swedish drama film directed by Alf Sjöberg and starring Maj-Britt Nilsson, Per Oscarsson and Ulf Palme. It was shot at the Råsunda Studios in Stockholm and on location in Gothenburg. The film's sets were designed by the art director P.A. Lundgren.

Cast
 Maj-Britt Nilsson as Lena Hern
 Per Oscarsson as Nisse Bortom
 Ulf Palme as Harry
 Ulla Sjöblom as Ulla
 Gertrud Fridh as Lizzie
 Jane Friedmann as Ester
 Eva Stiberg as Mrs. Carlsson
 Kolbjörn Knudsen as Captain Hern
 Helge Hagerman as Åke Carlsson
 Erik Strandmark as Furniture dealer
 Allan Edwall as Fiorentino
 Tommy Nilsson as Stickan
 Gunnar Collin as Berra
 Jan-Olof Strandberg as Moje
 Bengt Blomgren as Gunnar
 Aurore Palmgren as Mrs. Larsson
 Olof Thunberg as 	Caretaker
 Ernst Brunman as Caretaker
 Carin SwenssonMother 
 Sten Mattsson as 	Spectator
 Ivar Wahlgren as 	Tug Skipper

References

Bibliography 
 Per Olov Qvist & Peter von Bagh. Guide to the Cinema of Sweden and Finland. Greenwood Publishing Group, 2000.

External links
 

1955 films
Swedish drama films
1950s Swedish-language films
1955 drama films
Swedish black-and-white films
Films directed by Alf Sjöberg
Films scored by Dag Wirén
Films based on Swedish novels
1950s Swedish films